McKees Town is a ghost town in Logan County, in the U.S. state of Ohio.

The town was founded at the site of an Indian village. McKees Town took its name from nearby McKees Creek.

References

Geography of Logan County, Ohio
Ghost towns in Ohio